The 2019–20 Luxembourg Cup was the 95th year of the football knockout tournament in Luxembourg. A place in the 2020–21 Europa League is available to the winners of this season's competition. The cup began on 4 September 2019 and was scheduled to end in May 2020.

F91 Dudelange were the defending champions after winning the Luxembourg Cup final in the previous season over Etzella Ettelbruck by the score of 5–0.

On 22 April 2020, the cup was abandoned due to COVID-19 pandemic in Luxembourg.

Preliminary round
Four preliminary round matches were played 4 September 2019. The draw for the preliminary and first rounds was held on 22 July 2019.

First round
Thirty-six first round matches were played on 5–8 September 2019. The draw for the preliminary and first rounds was held on 22 July 2019.

Second round
Thirty-two second round matches were played on 21–22 September 2019. The draw for the second round was held on 9 September 2019.

Third round
Sixteen third round matches were played on 9–10 November 2019. The draw for the third round was held on 25 September 2019.

Fourth round
Eight fourth round matches were played on 7–8 December 2019. The draw for the fourth round was held on 15 November 2019.

Quarter–finals
The quarter–final matches were scheduled to be played on 15 April 2020.

See also
 2019–20 Luxembourg National Division

References

External links
FLF
uefa.com

Cup
2019-20
Luxembourg
Luxembourg Cup